Copeland or Copeland's may refer to:

Places

Australia
 Copeland, New South Wales

Canada
 Copeland Islands (Nunavut)
 Copeland Islands Marine Provincial Park, in the Strait of Georgia, British Columbia
 Mount Copeland, also Copeland Ridge and Copeland Creek in same vicinity, in the Monashee Mountains of British Columbia

United Kingdom
 Borough of Copeland, Cumbria, England
 Copeland (UK Parliament constituency)
 An alternative name for Allerdale above Derwent, where the borough was named
 Copeland Islands, Northern Ireland

United States
 Copeland, Florida
 Copeland, Idaho
 Copeland, Kansas
 Copeland, Thomas County, Kansas
 Copeland, North Carolina
 Copeland, Texas, an unincorporated community in Smith County, Texas
 Copeland, a post office established in Atoka County
 Copeland, Delaware County, Oklahoma, a census-designated place in Delaware County, Oklahoma
 Copeland, Virginia

People

Other 
 Copland (operating system), Apple's failed OS
 Copeland (band), an indie rock band
 Copeland Bridge, a covered bridge in Edinburg, New York
 Copeland Lowery, a California lobbying firm
 Copeland Tower Suites, hotel in Metairie, Louisiana, a suburb of New Orleans
 Copeland Trophy, the award given to the best and fairest player for the Collingwood Football Club
 Copeland's, a restaurant chain
 Copeland's method, a voting system
 Copeland (pottery)
 Copeland–Erdős constant

See also 
 Copland (disambiguation)
 Copeland Creek (disambiguation)